Sallustio Cherubini (died 1659) was a Roman Catholic prelate who served as Bishop of Città Ducale (1652–1659).

Biography
Sallustio Cherubini was ordained a priest on 29 June 1617.
On 8 January 1652, he was appointed during the papacy of Pope Innocent X as Bishop of Città Ducale.
On 21 January 1652, he was consecrated bishop by Marcantonio Franciotti, Cardinal-Priest of Santa Maria della Pace, with Ranuccio Scotti Douglas, Bishop Emeritus of Borgo San Donnino, and Patrizio Donati, Bishop Emeritus of Minori serving as co-consecrators. 
He served as Bishop of Città Ducale until his death in 1659.

References

External links and additional sources
 (for Chronology of Bishops) 
 (for Chronology of Bishops) 

17th-century Italian Roman Catholic bishops
Bishops appointed by Pope Innocent X
1659 deaths